Harry Hamlet Roberts (November 12, 1895 – July 25, 1963), nicknamed "Rags", was an American Negro league outfielder in the 1920s.

A native of West Norfolk, Virginia, Roberts made his Negro leagues debut in 1922 with the Harrisburg Giants and Baltimore Black Sox. He played for Baltimore again the following season, and finished his career in 1928 with the Homestead Grays. Roberts died in Beckley, West Virginia in 1963 at age 67.

References

External links
 and Baseball-Reference Black Baseball stats and Seamheads

1895 births
1963 deaths
Baltimore Black Sox players
Harrisburg Giants players
Homestead Grays players
Baseball outfielders
20th-century African-American sportspeople